This is a list of Argentine Primera División top scorers, that enumerates all players that have finished a season as top goalscorers in the top level of the Argentine football league system from 1891 (the year that the first championship was held) to date.

All-time top scorers 
The ranking includes Primera División tournaments from 1891 to date:

Top scorers by year 
Below is the list of topscorers from 1891 to date:

Records and statistics 
 The youngest player ever to become top scorer in the Argentine Primera was Diego Maradona in the 1978 Metropolitano tournament at the age of 17.
 Héctor Scotta scored the most goals in a single calendar year, with 60 in 1975.
 Arsenio Erico is the only player to score more than 40 goals in a single tournament, he managed the feat twice in 1937, with 47 goals and in 1938 with 43 goals.
 Juan Taverna is the player who scored the most goals in a single match (7) when his club, Banfield, thrashed Bahía Blanca's Puerto Comercial 13–1 at Estadio Florencio Sola on October 6, 1974.
 José Luis Chilavert is the only goalkeeper to have scored 3 goals in a match. He set the record on November 28, 1999, when Vélez Sarsfield beat Ferro Carril Oeste 6–1 at José Amalfitani Stadium in the 1999 Apertura. This was not only an Argentine but a worldwide record for a goalkeeper.
 Clelio Caucia of Vélez Sarsfield became the first goalkeeper to have scored in Argentine football when he scored a penalty kick v Quilmes on June 24, 1924.
 Carlos Seppaquercia of Gimnasia y Esgrima LP set the record for the fastest goal in a match, scoring on 5 seconds v Huracán, on March 18, 1979 at Estadio Juan Carmelo Zerillo. The match ended 1–1.
 Eduardo Maglioni scored 3 goals within 1 minute and 51 seconds playing for Independiente v Gimnasia y Esgrima LP at "La Doble Visera" Stadium in a 1973 Metropolitano match on March 18, 1973.
 José Sanfilippo (1958–1961) and Diego Maradona (1978–1980) are the only players to have been top scorers on four consecutive seasons.
 Pedro Pasculli (1984 Nacional), and Diego Latorre and Darío Scotto (both in 1992 Clausura) became top scorers with the fewest goals, they only needed to score 9 times to claim their titles.
 Carlos Bianchi holds the record for the longest period in the top scorers list, his first came in the 1971 Metro and his last came in 1981 Nacional, a gap of 11 years.
 Bianchi also holds the record for the longest gap between titles, he waited nearly ten years between his 1971 Metropolitano and his 1981 Nacional titles.
 Martín Palermo holds the record for goals in a season of 19 matches. His 20 goals in the 1998 Apertura also made him the first player to average more than 1 goal per match since Juan Gómez Voglino (who is also the all-time Atlanta top scorer) in 1973.
 Paraguayan Arsenio Erico and Uruguayan Enzo Francescoli are the two foreigners to have been top scorer of Argentina on the most occasions. Erico was the top scorer three times in a row (between 1937 and 1939), while Francescoli was the top scorer in the 1984 Metropolitano, the 1985–86 season, and in the 1994 Apertura.
 Rolando Zárate and Mauro Zárate are the only brothers to have both been top scorer in the Argentine Primera (2004 Clausura and 2006 Apertura respectively).
 When Lisandro López claimed the 2004 Apertura title, he became the first Racing Club player to be top scorer in 35 years.
 In 2009 José Sand became the first player to become top scorer in consecutive tournaments since Diego Maradona in 1980.

Notes

References

 
 
Argentina
Argentina
Association football player non-biographical articles